Blackrock College Rugby Football Club is a rugby union club located in  Blackrock, Dublin, Ireland. The club was founded in 1882 by former pupils of Blackrock College. Their senior team currently plays in Division 2A of the All-Ireland League

Blackrock College RFC was founded in 1882 making it one of the oldest senior rugby clubs in Ireland. While it bears the name and is closely affiliated to the school at Williamstown, it is a very open local club.

The club fields adult men’s and women’s teams, under 20s and has a mini and youth section, all of whom are involved in the various competitions throughout Leinster.

The men’s senior adult team in Blackrock College RFC is in division 2A of the AIL. The club has a long tradition of producing players for the International side many of whom have also represented the Lions.

Honours
Leinster Senior Cup (8) 1937, 1939, 1957, 1961, 1983, 1988, 1992, 1999
 Leinster Senior League (4) 1975, 1982, 1983, 1991
League Section B (1) 1989
 Smithwicks Floodlit Cup (2) 1993, 1997
 Castle Trophy (2) 1978, 1983
Bateman Cup (1) 1939
 All Ireland League 2nd Division (1) 2000
 Paddy Moore Memorial Shield (2) 2002, 2008
 Jerry Fogarty Memorial Cup (4) 2001, 2002, 2005, 2007
 Brian McLoughlin Memorial Cup (1) 2008
 Brendan Merry Memorial Plate (1) 2008
 Junior 1 League (10) 1900, 1922, 1935, 1948, 1974, 1975, 1977, 1979, 1984, 2016Leinster Junior Cup (5) 1889, 1892, 1893, 1898, 1899
 Metropolitan Cup (8) 1929, 1938, 1962, 1975, 1976, 1977, 1984, 2001
 Junior 2 (Minor) League (14) 1925, 1926, 1927, 1930, 1937, 1938, 1958, 1961, 1964, 1982, 1993, 2005, 2006, 2007
 Albert O’Connell Cup (8) 1959, 1965, 1975, 1976, 1982, 2001, 2004, 2005
 Winters Cup (5) 1965, 1967, 1974, 1975, 1997
 Junior 3 League (3) 1972, 1974, 1998
 Moran Cup (11) 1966, 1975, 1976, 1986, 1989, 1991, 1992, 1993, 1995, 2002, 2004
 Junior 4 League (2) 1983, 1990
 James O’Connor Cup (6) 1965, 1988, 1991, 2004, 2005, 2007
 Guilfoyle Cup (3) 1987, 1990, 1991
 Tom Fox Cup (7) 1971, 1973, 1980, 1981, 1992, 1993, 2001
 Greenlea Cup (10) 1974, 1975, 1976, 1977, 1983, 1984, 1993, 1998, 1999, 2000
 McCorry Cup (9) 1972, 1988, 1990, 1991, 1997, 1998, 2004, 2007, 2010
 Junior Pennant (3) 1975, 1976, 1977
 Fraser McMullen All Ireland U’20 Cup (2) 1997, 1998
 J. P. Fanagan Cup (6) 1997, 1998, 2000, 2006, 2007, 2008
 Under 20s Pennant (3) 2001, 2003, 2007
 Hartigan Cup (Under 20s) (2) 2004, 2009
 Under 20s Purcell Cup (1) 2008
 Women All Ireland League (5) 1993, 1995, 1996, 1997, 2008
 Women All Ireland Cup Winners (3) 2002, 2006, 2007
 Youths (2) 2009 League & Cup Double
 Lorcan Sherlock Golf Cup''' (6) 1938, 1960, 1964, 1969, 1981, 1997

Notable former players

Ireland
The following Blackrock players represented Ireland at full international level.

British & Irish Lions
As well as representing Ireland, the following Blackrock players also went on to represent the British & Irish Lions.

 Niall Brophy: 1959, 1962
 Ray McLoughlin: 1966
 Mick Doyle: 1968
 Fergus Slattery: 1971, 1974
 Willie Duggan: 1977
 Hugo MacNeill: 1983

 Brendan Mullin: 1989
 Paul Wallace: 1997
 Shane Byrne: 2005
 Brian O'Driscoll: 2001, 2005, 2009, 2013
 Luke Fitzgerald: 2009

Other internationals
The following Blackrock players have also played at international level.

  Stephen Bachop
  Gavin Johnson
  Mike Brewer
  AJ MacGinty
  Brett Thompson
  Luke Thompson

2022/23 squad
Full-backs: Brian Colclough
Wings: Chris Rolland, Hugo Godson-Treacy, Matt Dwan
Centres: Dave McCarthy, James Moriarty, John Gallagher, Cillian Daly
Out-halves: Peter Quirke, James Fennelly 
Scrum-halves: Mark Edwards, Ross Barron 
Front-rows: Joe Byrne, Niall Hardiman, Andrew Savage, Paul McSweeney, James Mullany
Hookers: Liam McMahon, Stephen Judge, Dave Fortune
Second-rows: Hugh Doyle, Cian Reale, Josh Dixon, Ciaran Cassidy 
Wing-forwards: James Burke, Roy Whelan
Number 8s: Matt Cosgrove

References

External links
 Blackrock College RFC

 
Irish rugby union teams
Rugby clubs established in 1882
University and college rugby union clubs in Ireland
Rugby union clubs in Dún Laoghaire–Rathdown
Senior Irish rugby clubs (Leinster)